Kombai may be referring to:

 Kombai dog, a hound breed from the region of Kombai.
 Kombai people, an indigenous people in western New Guinea
 Kombai, Tamil Nadu
 Kombai language a Papuan language